The Freake Baronetcy, of Cromwell House in the Parish of St Mary Abbots, Kensington, and Fulwell Park in the Parish of Twickenham, both in the County of Middlesex, was a title in the Baronetage of the United Kingdom. It was created on 23 May 1882 for the architect, builder and philanthropist Charles Freake. The third Baronet was a polo player and also served as High Sheriff of Warwickshire in 1939.

The title became extinct on the death of the fourth Baronet in 1951 but whose sole child married the heir apparent to the O'Brien Baronetcy and became mother of that title's two prospective holders.

Freake baronets, of Cromwell House and Fulwell Park (1882)
Sir Charles James Freake, 1st Baronet (1814–1884)
Sir Thomas George Freake, 2nd Baronet (1848–1920)
Sir Frederick Charles Maitland Freake, 3rd Baronet (1876–1950)
Sir Charles Arland Maitland Freake, 4th Baronet (1904–1951)

Thomas George Freake
The second Baronet was born 12 October and his maternal grandfather was Charles Wright; he graduated from Magdalene College, Cambridge then married in 1868 Frederica, daughter of Col. F. T. Maitland in Holywich, Sussex. He had one son, two daughters and died 21 December 1920.  He belonged to the Conservative, Ranelagh, Hurlingham clubs and lived some time at 43 Sloane Street.

He was Mayor of the small borough of Dartmouth, Devon in 1897 (abolished in 1974). His grandson (and eventual heir) lived in the early 20th century at Halford Manor in the parish of Shipston-on-Stour.

References

 

Extinct baronetcies in the Baronetage of the United Kingdom